The Samuel and Ann Young House in Post Falls, Idaho was built c.1900 and was listed on the National Register of Historic Places in 1997.

It is a one-and-a-half-story "modest vernacular version of the Queen Anne style."  It was deemed significant as "a rare survivor of the first
significant developmental period in the history of Post Falls."

References

Houses on the National Register of Historic Places in Idaho
Queen Anne architecture in Idaho
Houses completed in 1900
Kootenai County, Idaho